John Morgan Evans (January 7, 1863 – March 12, 1946) was an American Democratic politician.

Biography
He was born in Sedalia, Missouri. Evans went to the United States Military Academy and then graduated from University of Missouri. He studied law and practiced law in Missoula, Montana. Evans was judge of the police court, register of the United States Land Office, and served as Mayor of Missoula, Montana. He was elected as a Democrat to the United States House of Representatives from Montana and served from March 4, 1913 to March 4, 1921. He was defeated in his bid for re-election in 1920, but regained his seat in the 1922 election and served from March 4, 1923 to March 4, 1933. He died in Washington, D.C.

References

1863 births
1946 deaths
People from Sedalia, Missouri
Mayors of Missoula, Montana
United States Military Academy alumni
University of Missouri alumni
American people of Welsh descent
Montana lawyers
Democratic Party members of the United States House of Representatives from Montana